Carabus deyrollei is a species of ground beetle from Carabinae subfamily that is endemic to Spain.

References

deyrollei
Beetles described in 1839
Beetles of Europe
Endemic fauna of Spain